James Louis Mills (born November 7, 1947) is an American epidemiologist and Senior Investigator in the Epidemiology Branch of the Division of Intramural Population Health Research in the Eunice Kennedy Shriver National Institute of Child Health and Human Development. He has studied the effects of iodine and folic acid consumption on outcomes such as female fertility and the risk of birth defects.

References

External links
Faculty page

Living people
1947 births
American epidemiologists
National Institutes of Health faculty
Cornell University alumni
Scientists from New York City